Hvem er hvem? was a Norwegian book series, presenting facts about notable persons from Norway. The first edition was issued in 1912, and the 14th edition came in 1994. In the 2008 edition, edited by Knut Olav Åmås, one thousand persons were selected for presentation. About one third of the articles are longer, signed biographies, while the rest have a shorter, more encyclopedic format.

Edition history 
1912 (First edition, edited by Chr. Brinchmann, Anders Daae and K.V. Hammer). 3,500 biographies.
1930 (2nd edition, edited by Hjalmar Steenstrup). 3,250 biographies, of which 1,750 are new.
1934 (3rd edition, edited by Hjalmar Steenstrup)
1938 (4th edition, edited by Hjalmar Steenstrup)
1948 (5th edition, edited by Harald Gram and Bjørn Steenstrup).
1950 (6th edition, edited by Harald Gram and Bjørn Steenstrup)
1955 (7th edition, edited by Harald Gram and Bjørn Steenstrup)
1959 (8th edition, edited by Harald Gram and Bjørn Steenstrup)
1964 (9th edition, edited by Bjørn Steenstrup)
1968 (10th edition, edited by Bjørn Steenstrup)
1973 (11th edition, edited by Bjørn Steenstrup). 3,840 biographies, of which 520 are new.
(12th edition)
(13th edition)
1994 (14th edition)
2008 (edited by Knut Olav Åmås, 665 pp.)

The 1st, 2nd, 5th and 11th editions are available online.

See also
Who's Who

References

Book series introduced in 1912
Publications established in 1912
Norwegian books
1912 establishments in Norway